The Nininger Meteorite Award awarded by the Center for Meteorite Studies recognizes outstanding student achievement in the “Science of Meteoritics” as embodied by an original research paper.  In 1965, Dr. Harvey H. Nininger and Mrs. Addie D. Nininger endowed the Nininger Science of Meteoritics Fund to the Center for Meteorite Studies at Arizona State University in order to promote interest in meteorite-related topics among young scientists.  A number of prominent planetary scientists and meteoriticists have won this award including William K. Hartmann, Hap McSween, and Dante Lauretta.

Nininger Meteorite Award Winners
Source: Nininger Past Recipients

See also
 Glossary of meteoritics
 Harvey H. Nininger
 Center for Meteorite Studies
 List of astronomy awards
 Prizes named after people

References

External links
Nininger award website
Center for Meteorite Studies

Astronomy prizes
Meteorite prizes
American awards
Awards established in 1961